The 2018–19 St. Bonaventure Bonnies women's basketball team represents the St. Bonaventure University during the 2018–19 NCAA Division I women's basketball season. The Bonnies, led by third year head coach Jesse Fleming, play their home games at Reilly Center and were members of the Atlantic 10 Conference. They finished the season 8–22, 5–11 in A-10 play to finish in a tie for twelfth place. They lost in the first round of the A-10 women's tournament to Davidson.

Media
All non-televised Bonnies home games air on the A-10 Digital Network. WGWE continue to be the radio broadcaster for the team. Chris Russell is the team's play-by-play voice; no color commentator is used.

Roster

Schedule

|-
!colspan=9 style=| Exhibition

|-
!colspan=9 style="background:#; color:#FFFFFF;"| Non-conference regular season

|-
!colspan=9 style=| Atlantic 10 regular season

|-
!colspan=9 style=| Atlantic 10 Tournament

Rankings
2018–19 NCAA Division I women's basketball rankings

See also
 2018–19 St. Bonaventure Bonnies men's basketball team

References

Saint Bonaventure
St. Bonaventure Bonnies women's basketball seasons